Chrysoclista abchasica is a species of moth of the family Agonoxenidae. It is found in the Czech Republic, Georgia and Abkhazia (Transcaucasia).

The wingspan is about 9 mm. Adults have been recorded on wing at the beginning of July.

Subspecies
Chrysoclista abchasica abchasica
Chrysoclista abchasica gabretica Šumpich, 2012 (Czech Republic)

References

Moths described in 1986
Agonoxeninae
Moths of Europe
Moths of Asia